Pepita Sánchez (born 5 May 1952) is a Spanish gymnast. She competed at the 1972 Summer Olympics.

References

External links
 

1952 births
Living people
Spanish female artistic gymnasts
Olympic gymnasts of Spain
Gymnasts at the 1972 Summer Olympics
Gymnasts from Barcelona
20th-century Spanish women